Werra-Meißner – Hersfeld-Rotenburg is an electoral constituency (German: Wahlkreis) represented in the Bundestag. It elects one member via first-past-the-post voting. Under the current constituency numbering system, it is designated as constituency 169. It is located in northern Hesse, comprising the Werra-Meißner-Kreis and Hersfeld-Rotenburg districts.

Werra-Meißner – Hersfeld-Rotenburg was created for the 2002 federal election. Since 2002, it has been represented by Michael Roth of the Social Democratic Party (SPD).

Geography
Werra-Meißner – Hersfeld-Rotenburg is located in northern Hesse. As of the 2021 federal election, it comprises the Werra-Meißner-Kreis and Hersfeld-Rotenburg districts.

History
Werra-Meißner – Hersfeld-Rotenburg was created in 2002 and contained parts of the abolished constituencies of Hersfeld and Werra-Meißner. In the 2002 election, it was named Werra-Meißner – Hersfeld. It acquired its current name in the 2005 election. In the 2002 and 2005 elections, it was constituency 171 in the numbering system. In the 2009 election, it was number 170. Since 2013, it has been number 169. Its borders have not changed since its creation.

Members
The constituency has been represented by Michael Roth of the Social Democratic Party (SPD) since its creation.

Election results

2021 election

2017 election

2013 election

2009 election

Notes

References

Federal electoral districts in Hesse
2002 establishments in Germany
Constituencies established in 2002
Werra-Meißner-Kreis
Hersfeld-Rotenburg